

Events

Births

Deaths
 Dalfi d'Alvernha (born 1150), Count, troubadour and patron of troubadours 
 Pacificus (born unknown), poet laureate at the Court of Frederick II, Holy Roman Emperor; later becoming a disciple of St. Francis of Assisi

13th-century poetry
Poetry